Thylacodes colubrinus is a species of sea snail, a marine gastropod mollusk in the family Vermetidae, the worm snails or worm shells. This species was previously known as Serpulorbis colubrinus.

References

Vermetidae
Gastropods described in 1798